Conington, an English placename, could be

Conington, Huntingdonshire, Cambridgeshire, about 15 km from Huntingdon
Conington, South Cambridgeshire, Cambridgeshire, 10 km from Huntingdon